SRT-2104 is an experimental drug that was studied by Sirtris Pharmaceuticals as a small-molecule activator of the sirtuin subtype SIRT1. The compound progressed to Phase II human trials for Type II diabetes before development was discontinued, however it continues to be widely used in animal research into the functions of SIRT1.

See also 
 SRT-1460
 SRT-1720
 SRT-2183
 SRT-3025
 STAC-9

References 

Anti-aging substances
4-Morpholinyl compunds
Thiazoles
3-Pyridyl compounds
Amides